India uses a plethora of terms to denote the large number of subdistricts across its  28 states and 8 union territories. The most commonly used term, prevalent across states in North India and widely used by the union government is tehsil. Other terms such as taluks, subdivisions, mandals, circles are officially used in the administration of respective states. The current terms have replaced earlier geographical terms, such as pargana and thana.

Most subdistricts in India correspond to an area within a district including the designated city, town, hamlet, or other populated place that serves as its administrative centre, with possible additional towns, and usually a number of villages.

Statewise subdistricts 

States use varying names for their sub-districts. Detailed information is as follows (as of 2018):

See also
 List of community development blocks in India

References 

 Map of tehsils each states
 Interactive map of tehsils of india

Tehsils of India
India 3
Sub-districts, India